Events from the year 1906 in Taiwan, Empire of Japan.

Incumbents

Central government of Japan
 Prime Minister: Katsura Tarō, Saionji Kinmochi

Taiwan 
 Governor-General: Kodama Gentarō, Sakuma Samata

Events

March
 17 March – The 6.8  Meishan earthquake affected the southwestern portion of the island with a maximum Mercalli intensity of IX (Violent), causing at least 1,258 deaths and several thousand injuries.

Births
 21 July – Teng Yu-hsien, former musician.

References

 
Years of the 20th century in Taiwan